Muhammad Saeed Azad (born August 14, 1964, Karachi, Sindh) is a former Pakistani cricketer who played four ODIs between 1995 and 1996.

References 
born 14August 1966
A Former Coach/Manager Pakistan A, Karachi Region and National Bank of Pakistan 

1966 births
Living people
Pakistan One Day International cricketers
Pakistani cricketers
Karachi cricketers
Karachi Whites cricketers
National Bank of Pakistan cricketers
Karachi Blues cricketers
Cricketers from Karachi